Already Famous (Chinese:一泡而红: Yi Pao Er Hong) is a 2011 Singaporean comedy film and the feature film directorial debut of Michelle Chong, who also starred in the film alongside Taiwanese idol Alien Huang. The movie was released on 1 December 2011 in Singapore and was selected as the Singaporean entry for the Best Foreign Language Oscar at the 85th Academy Awards 2013.

Already Famous was well received in Singapore, where it grossed S$1.04 million and viewer demand for the film grew so high that movie theaters had to double the number of screens showing the film.

Plot
Ah Kiao (Michelle Chong) is a young village woman from Yong Peng, Malaysia, who spends much of her time dreaming about becoming a famous actor like the ones she sees in her beloved soap operas, much to the chagrin of her family. Despite her family's disapproval, she travels to Singapore to chase her dream and ends up taking on a job as a salesgirl to make ends meet while auditioning. During her stay, Ah Kiao meets a handsome coffee shop worker (Alien Huang), which threatens to distract her from her dream.

Cast
 Michelle Chong as Ah Kiao
 Alien Huang as Christopher / Ah Seng
 Chua En Lai as Vaness
 David Gan as Celebrity hair stylist
 Sherry Lim as Hair salon receptionist
 Patricia Mok as Modeling agency booker
 Ernest Seah as Earness
 Hee Ker Ru as Little Ah Kiao
 Hao Jun Cai as Little Ah Kiao's Brother
 Wilson Ng as Ah Kiao Father
 Meng Chue Lok as Kiao's Grandmother

Reception
The Hollywood Reporter gave Already Famous a mixed review, writing "This lightweight film drags on for two hours, when 90 minutes would have been just about right. Still, the likable cast and knowing touches keep us watching right up until the end credits, which feature the same kind of outrageous out-takes that end many American comedies." Variety was more positive in their review, where they called it "A cheery hoot that pokes fun at showbiz pomposity even as it affirms its protag's impervious optimism."

See also
 List of submissions to the 85th Academy Awards for Best Foreign Language Film
 List of Singaporean submissions for the Academy Award for Best Foreign Language Film

References

External links
 

2011 films
2011 comedy films
Chinese-language films
Singaporean comedy films